Prisoner (known in the UK and the US as Prisoner: Cell Block H) is an Australian television soap opera, which broadcast on Network Ten (originally The 0-10 Network) from February 27 (Melbourne) February 26 (Sydney) 1979 to December 1986 (Melbourne), though the series finale would not screen until September 1987 in Sydney, where it aired as a 3-hour film that was split into three 1-hour episodes at the much-later time-slot of 10.30pm, running eight seasons and 692 episodes. Prisoner was the first Australian series to feature a primarily female-dominated cast and carried the slogan "If you think prison is hell for a man, imagine what it would be like for woman!"
 
The series, produced by the Grundy Organisation, was conceived by Reg Watson and filmed at the then Network Ten Melbourne Studios at Nunawading and on location. 

The series garnered an international cult following, and it was one of Australia's most successful media exports, performing particularly well in the United States and Canada (billed as Prisoner: Cell Block H and Caged Women, respectively). It also built a large audience in the United Kingdom and other European countries, most especially Sweden. 

Sammy Davis Jr. was a major fan and visited the set, and wanted to appear in a role, but had other engagements at the time

The cult status of the series has seen many adaptations, including the modern 21st century re-imaging series Wentworth on Foxtel.

Background

Ian Bradley served as original producer and then executive producer, from series 2, whilst associate producer and screenwriter was Ian Smith, who appeared as an actor in the series as Head of the Department Ted Douglas, prior to becoming famous as the character Harold Bishop in Neighbours; another screenwriter, Anne Lucas, also acted briefly in the series playing prison bookie Faye Quinn.
 
The series is loosely based on British prison drama series Within These Walls, although it focuses more on the prisoners or inmates, rather than the prison staff led by officious governor Faye Boswell, played by Googie Withers, who was even approached by producers of Prisoner to play the governor. 
 
The series is set in the fictional Wentworth Detention Centre, in the fictional suburb of Wentworth, in Melbourne, Victoria and follows the lives of the prisoners and staff within cell block H, and to a lesser extent, others on the outside, such as family members, doctors and lawyers. Numerous scenes also took place outside the compound exploring the lives of the inmates and staff outside of the prison - in particular, "Driscoll House", a half-way house where inmates were housed after being released, or neighbouring correction institutions like Barnhurst (a lower-security country prison) and Blackmoor (an aged, yet high-security, prison).

The series gained a positive reception. Initially conceived as a stand-alone miniseries of 16 episodes, its popularity meant it was developed into an ongoing series. It has since endured worldwide, acquiring cult classic status, particularly for its somewhat outrageous acting and plotlines.

Creation and production

Prisoner was created by Reg Watson, who had produced the British soap opera Crossroads from 1964 to 1973 and then the Australian soaps The Young Doctors and Sons and Daughters and post-prisoner soap opera Neighbours

Inspired by the British television drama Within These Walls, the show was initially conceived as a 16-episode series, with a pilot episode bearing the working title "Women Behind Bars". Its storylines focused on the lives of the prisoners and, to a lesser extent, the officers and other prison staff. When the initial episodes met an enthusiastic reception, it was felt that Prisoner could be developed into an ongoing soap opera. The early storylines were developed and expanded, with assistance from the Victorian Corrective Services Department.

The show's themes, often radical, included feminism, LGBT matters, and social reform. Prisoner began in early 1979 with the advertising slogan, "If you think prison is hell for a man, imagine what it's like for a woman". The series examined how women dealt with incarceration and separation from their families and friends, and the common phenomenon of released inmates re-offending. Within the prison, major themes were interpersonal relationships, power struggles, friendships and rivalries. The prisoners became a surrogate family, with the self-styled "Queen Bea", Bea Smith and the elderly "Mum" (Jeanette) Brooks (Mary Ward) emerging as central matriarch figures. Several lesbian characters were introduced on the show, including prisoners Franky Doyle (played by Carol Burns) and Judy Bryant (played by Betty Bobbitt), as well as corrupt and sinister officer Joan Ferguson (Maggie Kirkpatrick).

Continuity

Characters and story exposition were often 'retconned' in order to expand potential storylines. Initially there was a men's prison "next door" to Wentworth, but it was never mentioned again after the early episodes. Barnhurst was originally a co-ed prison, soon becoming a women's facility. Its security status varied considerably with it being described as an 'open prison farm' by the end of the run; although it was often described as "low-security", serial murderers Bea Smith and Marie Winter were housed there for long periods. Although Blackmoor Prison was initially described as a brand new, state-of-the-art maximum-security prison, it was depicted as a Victorian-era workhouse when finally seen. Wentworth was variously described as either new or built during World War II, with aged infrastructure.

During the show's run, several recurring characters were played by multiple actresses and actors. Meg Jackson (later Morris) (Elspeth Ballantyne) son and stepdaughter, Marty Jackson and Tracey Morris, were each played by multiple different actors—Ronald Korosy, Andrew McKaige, and Michael Winchester as Marty, and Sue Devine and Michelle Thomas as Tracey. In the closing year, Nicki Paull's character Lisa Mullins was taken over by Terrie Waddell.

Synopsis

Viewers' introduction to the Wentworth Detention Centre featured the arrival of two new prisoners, Karen Travers (Peta Toppano) and Lynn Warner (Kerry Armstrong). Travers was charged with murdering her husband in a crime of passion after he was found in-bed with another woman (her flashback featured a shower scene that was a nod to Alfred Hitchcock's classic Psycho), whilst Warner insisted she was innocent despite her conviction for the abduction and attempted murder of a child. Both women were sent to the prison's maximum-security wing (H Block), where they were horrified by their new surroundings. Karen was confronted with a former lover—prison doctor Greg Miller (Barry Quin)—and was sexually harassed by violent lesbian cellmate Franky Doyle (Carol Burns). Lynn was ostracised by the other prisoners because of her crime (prisoners are known for their intolerance of offenders against children) and terrorised by Bea Smith, who burnt her hand in the laundry's steam press in one of the series' most iconic early scenes.

Other, less volatile prisoners included elderly, garden-loving Jeanette "Mum" Brooks who was incarcerated for the euthanasia of her husband who had terminal cancer, teddy-clutching misfit and childlike Doreen Anderson (Colette Mann), alcoholic former cook recidivist Lizzie Birdsworth (Sheila Florance), who apparently poisoned a group of shearers, and seductive prostitute Gladys "Marilyn" Mason (Margaret Laurence), who seduced prison electrician Eddie Cook (Richard Moir). The prison officers (or "screws", as the prisoners call them) included firm-but--heeled governor Erica Davidson (Patsy King); dour deputy governor Vera Bennett (Fiona Spence), who was always wanting to become Governor and was nicknamed "Vinegar Tits" by Franky; and firm but compassionate senior officer Meg Jackson (later Morris) (Elspeth Ballantyne).

Early episodes featured a high level of violence: Lynn Warner's burning in a steam press; a prisoner hanging herself in her cell; a fatal stabbing; and a flashback sequence inspired by which Karen Travers stabbed her abusive husband to death in the shower. The series' first major story arc was the turf war between Bea and Franky, in a bid to become the prison's "Top Dog" (unofficial leader), culminating by Episode 3 in a riot where Meg was held hostage and her husband—prison social worker Bill Jackson (Don Barker)—was stabbed to death by inmate Chrissie Latham (Amanda Muggleton).

Series extension

Prisoner premiered in Australia on 27 February 1979. Its success prompted the producers to extend the series, first from 16 to 20 episodes and then indefinitely. The production schedule increased from one to two-hour-long episodes per week; Carol Burns left the show after 20 episodes, feeling that she could not continue playing Franky Doyle with the tighter schedule. Her storyline sees her as an escapee from Wentworth with fellow inmate Doreen Anderson, and after being on the run for three weeks, she is shot dead by an officer

New story arcs were introduced. Karen Travers appealed against her sentence and was eventually released, allowing her to resume her relationship with Greg Miller and becoming involved in prison reform. As original characters began leaving the series (Mum Brooks, Lynn Warner, Karen and Greg appeared beyond the initial sixteen episodes, but most had left by the end of the 1979 season; Greg left in early 1980), new characters arrived: hulking husband-beater Monica Ferguson (Lesley Baker), career criminal Noeline Bourke (Jude Kuring), troubled murderess Roslyn Coulson (Sigrid Thornton) and imprisoned mother Pat O'Connell (Monica Maughan), in addition to shorter-term inmates with brief storylines. Prostitute Chrissie Latham, a minor character in the early episodes, returned in a more central antagonistic role and a male deputy governor, Jim Fletcher (Gerard Maguire), joined the female-dominated cast.

Final season

Ratings had been declining for some time, and when they continued to fall in 1986, Network Ten decided in July not to renew the series. Production ended on 5 September, and the final episode aired in Melbourne on 11 December 1986. The producers had several weeks' notice that the series was ending, enabling them to construct strong concluding storylines (including the ultimate defeat of Joan "the Freak" Ferguson). Prisoner final episodes dealt with the redemption of the misunderstood Kath Maxwell and concluded the ongoing dynamic between Rita Connors (played by Glenda Linscott) and Joan Ferguson (Maggie Kirkpatrick).

Main Cast
For extended cast list see article: Prisoner cast list

Supporting cast

Broadcast sheet

Days and times listed are for Network Ten Melbourne Station ATV-10, days and times may vary in other regions of Australia.

Spin-offs, remakes and specials

Spin-offs

Willow B: Women in Prison

A pilot for an unproduced American version of Prisoner was produced by Lorimar in 1980, entitled Willow B: Women in Prison. The cast included Ruth Roman, Virginia Capers, Carol Lynley, and Sally Kirkland. The pilot aired on ABC-TV on 29 June 1980.

Wentworth

In March 2012, it was announced that Foxtel would produce a contemporary "re-imagining" of Prisoner, Wentworth, set in modern-day Australia. Wentworth recounts the rise of Bea Smith (Danielle Cormack) from her arrival at Wentworth as a remand prisoner to "top dog". The series is filmed at a new, purpose-built prison set in the Melbourne suburb of Clayton.

Wentworth features contemporary versions of vintage characters along with new characters. Characters and cast members include Bea Smith (Danielle Cormack), crime matriarch Jacs Holt (Kris McQuade), Liz Birdsworth (Celia Ireland), Doreen Anderson (Shareena Clanton), Franky Doyle (Nicole da Silva), Sue "Boomer" Jenkins (Katrina Milosevic), social worker Erica Davidson (Leeanna Walsman), officer Will Jackson (Robbie Magasiva), officer Matthew Fletcher (Aaron Jeffery), deputy governor Vera Bennett (Kate Atkinson), and governor Meg Jackson (Catherine McClements), as well as Linda Miles (Jacquie Brennan), Joan Ferguson (Pamela Rabe), Sean Brody (Rick Donald), Greg Miller (David de Lautour), Marie Winter (Susie Porter), Rita Connors (Leah Purcell).

None of the original cast was initially scheduled to return for the first series, but on 29 November 2012 it was confirmed that Anne Charleston (who appeared in the original series) would make a guest appearance, as well as Sigrid Thornton who was in the original series as Ros Coulson, Thornton would play Sonia Stevens. Wentworth premiered in Australia on Foxtel's SoHo channel on 1 May 2013. As of 2018, the series was still in production, with a sixth season premiering on 19 June 2018, while a seventh season had been announced and due to air in 2019. Season 7 aired in May 2019. While Wentworth was confirmed for a 2021 ending, it won't surpass Prisoner in episodes, but will surpass the show in years on air.

Spoofs

In 1980 Saturday Night Live aired a parody of the series, "Debs Behind Bars". In the sketch, the inmates (including guest host Teri Garr) are spoiled debutantes who complain about "icky" living conditions in prison. During the early 1990s, Seven Network's comedy sketch program Fast Forward parodied Prisoner; Gina Riley (Bea Smith), Jane Turner (Lizzie Birdsworth), Magda Szubanski (Doreen) and Marg Downey as officer (Joan Ferguson) gave scenes from the series a comedic twist.

Other series to have featured Prisoner spoofs included The Paul Hogan Show, Let the Blood Run Free, Naked Video and The Krypton Factor.

Prisoner-inspired shows
In 1991, Prisoner was reprised for the American market as Dangerous Women. The US version borrowed heavily from the Australian original for characters and was created and written by Reg Watson, who had also created the original Australian series. In Dangerous Women, the emphasis was outside the prison, focusing on prisoner relationships in a halfway house. It is remembered now mainly for the early appearance of actor Casper Van Dien in the role of Brad Morris. In 1997, Prisoner was revised in a German-language version, Hinter Gittern – Der Frauenknast (Behind Bars). The series ran from 1997 to 2007 for 16 series and 403 episodes.

Talking Prisoner
On June 18, 2021 producer Matt Batten created the Talking Prisoner podcast and YouTube channel. Batten's co-host Ken Mulholland served as head cameraman on Prisoner from the series debut until episode 692. Mulholland and Batten interview cast and crew from Prisoner in depth. The podcast however also features interviews with cast and crew from other popular Australian internationally successful series like Sons and Daughters and Neighbours.

The channel can be found on YouTube, and the official website "Talking Prisoner.com", and is also broadcast on social media sites such as Facebook.

Merchandise

There have been several tie-in books and video and DVD releases. Prisoner theme song ("On the Inside", sung by Lynne Hamilton) reached number four in Australia in 1979 and peaked at number three on the UK Singles Chart in 1989. "On the Inside" was re-released as a digital download and CD single in March 2012. The song was featured as a B-side on punkabilly group The Living End's EP, Second Solution / Prisoner of Society.

Books (tie-in publications)

Based on the Series

There have been numerous publications on the series, including tie-in paperback novels, including publication's by Pinnacle Books, which in 1980, led by the actors union the Media, Entertainment and Arts Alliance and represented by cast member Val Lehman (Bea Smith), which saw the cast go on strike due to the content in the United States: soft-core pornography at odds with the series. Six books were published: Prisoner: Cell Block H, The Franky Doyle Story, The Karen Travers Story, The Frustrations of Vera, The Reign of Queen Bea and The Trials of Erica.

Two behind-the-scenes books were published in the UK during the early 1990s. Prisoner: Cell Block H – Behind the Scenes was written by Terry Bourke and published by Angus & Robertson Publishers, who published similar books about soap opera's Neighbours and Home and Away. Bourke documents the show's genesis and development, and the book has many stills and character profiles. Hilary Kingsley's Prisoner Cell Block H – The Inside Story emphasises more on plot and characters.

A limited-edition book, The Inside Story, was published in 2007 as part of the full-series DVD release in Australia. Written by TV journalists Andrew Mercado and Michael Idato, the commemorative book has the series' background, year-by-year storylines, character details and quotes by cast and crew. It was available as part of The Complete Collection DVD set.

Biographies and memoirs of cast members

There are also several published autobiographies, biographies and memoirs of cast members:

 Colette Mann published 2 books, It's a Mann's World in 1990 and Give Me a Break in 2002 

 Betty Bobbitt self-published From the Outside, in 2011, which are her memoirs of her career which included playing the role of Judy Bryant on Prisoner.

 Sheila Florance biography titled "On the Inside" was published in 2016 by Helen Martineau, which details her career as an actress and performer, including her role as Lizzie Birdsworth on Prisoner.  

 Maggie Kirkpatrick, published her own autobiography in 2019, about her performing career, titled The Gloves Are Off, named after the iconic leather gloves that she occasionally worn as Joan Ferguson on Prisoner.

DVD releases

The complete series of Prisoner is available on DVD format in both Australia and the United Kingdom. On Region 4 in Australia, distribution company Shock Records released the series over forty volumes, and a complete collection, comprising these volumes; the UK editions, from FremantleMedia, made the series available over twenty volumes (doubling-up on the Australian sets). In 2016, ViaVision acquired the rights to re-release the series in Australia and made the decision to release the series in their original season formats. See above for a full listing of VHS and DVD sets available. The following is an overview of Prisoner releases in their seasons formats.

Theatre and musicals
A stage version of Prisoner, based on the original scripts, was produced in 1989 and toured the United Kingdom. Elspeth Ballantyne (Meg Morris) and Patsy King (Erica Davidson) reprised their characters and Glenda Linscott (Rita Connors) played a new character, Angela Mason. A second tour, with Fiona Spence (Vera Bennett) and Jane Clifton (Margo Gaffney), followed in 1990; Jacqui Gordon (Susie Driscoll) played new character Kath Evans.

A musical version followed, with Maggie Kirkpatrick reprising her role as Joan (the Freak) Ferguson and Lily Savage as an inmate. The musical, a parody of Prisoner kitschier aspects, toured and had a West End run in 1995 and 1997. Val Lehman (Bea) was critical of the production, questioning why a drag queen would be in a women's prison.

Due to Prisoner popularity in the UK during the late 1980s, its British fan club organised personal-appearance tours for several actresses including Val Lehman (Bea Smith), Carol Burns (Franky Doyle), Betty Bobbitt (Judy Bryant), Sheila Florance (Lizzie Birdsworth), Amanda Muggleton (Chrissie Latham) and Judy McBurney (Pixie Mason). A TV special, The Great Escape, was produced in 1990. The programme, which featured Val Lehman, Sheila Florance, Amanda Muggleton and Carol Burns on their 1990 UK visit, includes extensive footage of their on-stage interview with TV presenter Anna Soubry in which the cast members discuss their time on the series. Recorded at the Derby Assembly Rooms in Derby, it was briefly available in the UK on VHS video.

Several Prisoner actors have appeared in British stage drama and pantomime, including Val Lehman (The Wizard of Oz, Beatrix Potter and Misery), Peta Toppano, Fiona Spence, Maggie Dence (Bev Baker), Debra Lawrance (Daphne Graham), Linda Hartley (Roach Waters), Ian Smith (Ted Douglas) and Maggie Millar (Marie Winter).

Popular culture references
In 1997 a Prisoner clip from its second episode (Franky Doyle and Lynn Warner's fight in the garden) appeared on the BBC sitcom Birds of a Feather, and the series was mentioned several times during Birds of a Feather seven-and-a-half-year run. The theme song was played briefly in episode three of BBC sitcom One Foot in the Grave. Prisoner has also been referenced in British sitcoms 2point4 Children, Absolutely Fabulous and Two Pints of Lager and a Packet of Crisps, as well as the soap operas Coronation Street, Brookside and EastEnders.

International broadcast

United Kingdom

Prisoner began airing on Yorkshire Television on 8 October 1984, with the franchise cutting scenes involving hanging (including the attempted hanging of Sandy Edwards and the hanging of Eve Wilder). Yorkshire also heavily edited the episode 326 fight scene with Joan and Bea. Several other regions also cut scenes deemed inappropriate despite its time slot, well past the 9 pm watershed.

The TVS region followed in October 1985. In 1987 Central, Thames, Scottish and TSW began the series; most other regions began broadcasting it in 1988, nearly two years after it finished production. Ulster began broadcasting Prisoner in late 1989, usually airing after their Friday night local talk show "Kelly" which aired at 10.40pm, would have a tradition of "Prisoner" following at 11.40pm. When the Kelly Show extended to a 90-minute version from the autumn of 1990, Prisoner would air at 12.10am. Maggie Kirkpatrick and Val Lehman both appeared on the Kelly Show on occasions, such was the popularity of the show airing after "Kelly" every Friday night.

Each ITV region decided when (and how often) Prisoner would be broadcast. Central Television screened three episodes weekly, finishing on 16 December 1991 before rerunning the first 95 episodes (from 1993 to 1995). Most other stations also completed the series: Granada Television and Border Television on 9 February 1995, Grampian Television on 11 March 1996, HTV on 25 April 1996, STV on 19 November 1996, Yorkshire Television and Tyne Tees Television on 7 April 1997. When Border, Grampian and Granada TV screened the final episode in the UK, continuity announcer John McKenzie conducted a telephone interview with Maggie Kirkpatrick (Joan "the Freak" Ferguson).

Some UK regions did not see the entire series; Channel Television began the series on 16 January 1986 with episode 10, when it aligned its schedule with TVS; it was previously aligned with TSW, which did not broadcast the series in its own region until 1987. Regional alignment meant that around the end of 1992, some episodes were skipped; Tyne Tees skipped 293 and 294 and Border Television omitted 71 episodes, 477 to 547. Furthermore, in some regions, the series was discontinued prior to its final episode in later runs: in Ulster, Prisoner ended on Ulster Television with episode 562 on 15 December 1997. In London, where the series ran on Thames and subsequently Carlton Television, viewers were told after episode 598 on 20 August 1998 that the series would resume after a summer break however the series was then discontinued from screening in London. The last ITV Prisoner episode was shown on Meridian, which finished an initial run with episode 586 on 12 July 1999.

Early on 31 March 1997 Channel 5, which had begun broadcasting at 6 p.m. the previous evening, began a full run of Prisoner while later episodes were still appearing in many ITV regions. Except for an airing of the fire episode (326), as part of a 1995 Channel 4 soap weekend, it was the series' first UK network broadcast and gave some areas their first full run of the series. Although the schedule varied during the Channel 5 run, episodes were typically shown about five times a week in the 4:40 a.m. slot. It briefly moved to a late-night slot, usually around 11:30pm, before returning to the 4:40 a.m. slot. The Channel 5 run ended on 11 February 2001, with a double bill of the penultimate and final episodes. Channel 5 have no plans to re-run the series, despite viewer requests. For most of the Channel 5 run the programme was sponsored by Pot Noodle, with humorous Prisoner-esque sequences (set in a prison cell and playing on the series' wobbly scenery and props) played before and after the episodes and in the leads into and out of commercial breaks.

The Channel 5 broadcasts included commentary over the closing credits, usually from chief continuity announcer Bill Buckley but sometimes from deputy announcers such as Stuart McWilliam. This began in the early-100s episodes (when Prisoner briefly moved to the late-night slot), when Buckley would deliver a quip about the episode before making continuity announcements. This developed into humorous observations about the episode just shown, and the reading of letters and depicting of trivia sent in by viewers (which Buckley called "snippets"). Due to its early-morning slot, when most viewers relied on VCRs to follow the series, upcoming schedule changes were announced as part of the commentary.

United States

The series was first aired in the United States on KTLA in Los Angeles on 8 August 1979, initially under the original name, Prisoner. Shown Wednesdays at 8pm, it was the first Australian series broadcast in prime time in the United States. The series, whose first two episodes were screened as a two-hour special, was viewed by a quarter of all television viewers in the Los Angeles market and was in second place for the night, beaten only by ABC's Charlie's Angels.

The series would later be repackaged into a daily half-hour format, as Prisoner: Cell Block H, KYW-TV ran this format under the title The Women of Cell Block H. It was syndicated directly to local stations through Firestone Program Syndication Company during the early 1980s (particularly 1980 to '81). In New York City, where Prisoner: Cell Block H was telecasted on WPIX, it was rated higher than late-night staple The Tonight Show Starring Johnny Carson on WNBC and reruns of legendary series M*A*S*H on WNEW-TV, it paved the way for other popular Australian produced shows including miniseries Against the Wind and serial The Sullivans to be sold to international markets.

Under the half-hour format, the original episodes were broadcast in two parts, though some scenes were censored or removed for the US telecast. 

KTLA, however, continued to broadcast the series in a weekly hour format, though now Tuesdays at 8pm, and under the Prisoner: Cell Block H name. Picked up in at least 38 markets in early 1980, the program would leave the American airwaves by spring 1982, after the few stations that were still carrying the program, such as KOB-TV and WGN-TV, removed Prisoner from their schedules.

During the spring and summer of 1985, the series was screened nationally on USA Network, weekdays at 11am ET, also in a half-hour format. It is unknown which episodes were televised.

Stations that aired Prisoner: Cell Block H

Canada
In Canada, Prisoner began on 10 September 1979 as Caged Women on Global Television Network, at the time a small television network serving southern and eastern Ontario; the program was seen weekly on Monday nights at 9pm

The show would move to Tuesdays at 9 p.m. in the fall of 1980, continuing with the Caged Women title. The show would be off the schedule by the 1981–1982 television season, but by the fall of 1982, Global would reintroduce the show to the schedule, still as Caged Women, in the half-hour format, weeknights at midnight and 12:30am. The program would be off the schedule by the start of the 1983–1984 season.

Curiously, Global's use of Caged Women would continue even after the show debuted in the United States as Prisoner: Cell Block H, which led to viewers in the communities along the Ontario / Michigan border to watch the same program under two different titles: Caged Women on Global, and Prisoner: Cell Block H on WKBD-TV Detroit.

In Vancouver, Victoria and the Lower Mainland of British Columbia, Prisoner: Cell Block H was telecast under that title weekdays at 1pm during 1980 and 1981 on KVOS-TV, an independent station in Bellingham, Washington that included the greater Vancouver / Victoria region as part of its viewing area.

Sweden
The series was shown in Sweden where it was a cult broadcast on TV4, from 7 September 1994 and entitled Kvinofangelset (The Women's Prison). a fan club organised a regular get together and collected several thousands of signatures from fans to repeat the series in again, which TV4 did so in 2000, After the series ended that year, work began to persuade the network to repeat the series a third time. The network originally screened the series three times a week (Tuesday, Thursday and Saturday) in the late night program slot of 1am, with the final episode airing on 3 February 2000.

During the repeat run from 2000 until October 2004, the network screening was four times a week (Monday to Thursday) at 2:15 am. The episodes were then repeated on weekends with both the Monday and Tuesday episode on Saturday and the Wednesday and Thursday episodes on Sunday.

The second rerun began in May 2014, by station TV4 Guld and again airing Monday through to Thursdays, and screening at 10:00pm, with episode 32 on July 3.
 
The broadcast schedule was later changed to five nights a week airing at midnight. Season 8 began broadcasting Sjuan in September 2017 at 3:00 pm.

Other countries
In New Zealand, Prisoner was first shown on TV2 on Monday 2 March 1981 and aired up to four afternoons a week, Monday to Thursday, at 2:30 p.m. before moving to twice a week, Mondays and Tuesdays, in the same timeslot by October 1985. On Monday 9 February 1987, the series was moved to TV One and continued to air Mondays and Tuesdays at around 2:30 p.m. until Thursday 23 July 1987 when it aired only on Thursdays in that slot. The final episode of Prisoner was broadcast on Friday 16 September 1988 at 2:35 p.m. The series was rerun on Orange and, later, Sky 1.

In South Africa, public television network SABC 1 began airing the series in 1998, screening Thursday nights at 9 p.m. and a repeat showing on Fridays at 10:45; it was cancelled on 2 October 2000, after episode 156.

In Brazil, Prisoner aired as As Prisioneiras around the end of 1980 and early 1981 by TVS (since renamed SBT), Sundays at 10 p.m. The show was dubbed into Brazilian Portuguese locally by TVS and was cancelled after episode 82 had screened.

Australian reruns
Network Ten began rerunning Prisoner on 8 May 1995; the series was cancelled, despite promises that it would return after the 1996 Christmas break. BBC UKTV began airing it from the beginning on 30 November 1997, at 12:15am on Tuesday and Thursday and 11:30pm on Saturday and Sunday. A repeat was broadcast at 2pm on Monday.

Foxtel channel 111 channel began airing the series on 7 March 2011 at 6:30pm AEDT, later moving to 5:30pm AEDT on 10 December 2012. Each episode was repeated the following afternoon, with the final episode on the initial run airing on 11 November 2013. The next day, the channel began a repeat run from episode one at 3:00pm AEDT, later moving to 1:00pm AEST on 7 July 2014. Foxtel held unlimited screening rights to the series until 2019, airing the series 4 times back to back (from 2011 to 2019). Foxtel's final broadcast was on September 11, 2019. 

The series' popularity on Foxtel inspired plans for a modern-day remake.

Believing that Prisoner would resonate with new audiences, in 2010 111 group programming director Darren Chau planned to replay the series against the introduction of digital channel Eleven and Network Ten's plan to move Neighbours to Eleven. The channel ran a promotional campaign highlighting the rerun, with a new version of the theme song by Ella Hooper and a cast reunion.

Awards and nominations

See also
 Bad Girls
 Orange Is the New Black

Explanatory notes

References

External links

 
 On the Inside – official fan club
 Fan site with list of cuts in DVDs 
 Who's who in Wentworth? – fan site with complete episode guide
 Prisoner Cell Block H World – fan site with news and more
 Aussie Soap Archive: Prisoner – overview and review

1979 Australian television series debuts
1986 Australian television series endings
1970s Australian crime television series
1970s Australian drama television series
1970s crime drama television series
1970s LGBT-related television series
1970s prison television series
1970s television soap operas
1980s Australian crime television series
1980s Australian drama television series
1980s crime drama television series
1980s LGBT-related television series
1980s prison television series
1980s television soap operas
Australian LGBT-related television shows
Australian prison television series
Australian television soap operas
English-language television shows
Imprisonment and detention of women
LGBT-related drama television series
Network 10 original programming
Television shows set in Melbourne
Television series produced by The Reg Grundy Organisation
Lesbian-related television shows